Hajji Kola-ye Arazlu (also Romanized as Ḩājjī Kolā-ye Ārazlū; also known as Ḩājī Kolā, Ḩājjī Kalā, Ḩājjī Kolā, and Ḩājjī Kolā Sanam) is a village in Balatajan Rural District, in the Central District of Qaem Shahr County, Mazandaran Province, Iran. At the 2006 census, its population was 558, in 152 families.

References 

Populated places in Qaem Shahr County